The North Dakota University System (NDUS) is the public system of higher education and policy coordination entity in the U.S. state of North Dakota. The system includes all public institutions in the state including two research universities, four regional universities and five community colleges. Community colleges are termed simply colleges in the NDUS system. This convention is unique in that it is one of the minority of states that follow this terminology. The mission of NDUS to enhance the quality of life for all those served by the NDUS as well as the economic and social vitality of North Dakota.

The NDUS's policy making body is the North Dakota State Board of Higher Education, based in Bismarck. The system was officially organized in 1990.

Member institutions

Research universities
North Dakota State University in Fargo
University of North Dakota in Grand Forks

Universities
Dickinson State University in Dickinson
Mayville State University in Mayville
Minot State University in Minot
Valley City State University in Valley City

Community colleges
Bismarck State College in Bismarck
Lake Region State College in Devils Lake
Dakota College at Bottineau in Bottineau
North Dakota State College of Science in Wahpeton
Williston State College in Williston

References

External links
 

 
Public university systems in the United States